The Pertusariaceae are a family of lichen-forming fungi in the order Pertusariales.

Taxonomy
The family was formally circumscribed by German lichenologist Gustav Wilhelm Körber in 1846. It contained the genera Pertusaria and Ochrolechia until Pertusaria was shown to be polyphyletic in a 2006 publication. The family Ochrolechiaceae was created to contain Ochrolechia.

Genera
, Species Fungorum includes 6 genera and 379 species in the Pertusariaceae.
Lepra  – 81 spp.
Loxosporopsis  – 1 sp.
Pertusaria  – ca. 300 spp.
Phyllophiale  – 1 sp.
Thamnochrolechia  – 1 sp.
Verseghya  – 2 spp.

References

Pertusariales
Lichen families
Lecanoromycetes families
Taxa named by Gustav Wilhelm Körber
Taxa described in 1855